Edward Gaudan Longid (died September 23, 1993) was a bishop of the Episcopal Church in the Philippines.  He was consecrated as a suffragan bishop on February 2, 1963, in the Cathedral of St. Mary and St. John in Quezon City.  He was the first diocesan bishop of the Northern Philippines, serving from 1972 to 1975. He had seven children, one of whom, Robert Longid, was later a bishop of the same diocese.

References

1993 deaths
Filipino Episcopalians
Anglican bishops in the Philippines
Episcopal bishops of Northern Philippines
Filipino bishops
20th-century Anglican bishops in Asia